Elie Tahari (born 1952) is an Israeli fashion designer. He is the designer of ready-to-wear clothing and fashion accessories. His company is headquartered in New York City, with stores located throughout the world.

Early life
Tahari was born the middle son of an Iranian-Jewish couple in 1952. He has four sisters( Aliza, Diana, Shulie and Illana) and two brothers (Avraham and Yosi). The family immigrated from Iran to Israel, where they resided in a ma'abara transit camp in what is now Mevasseret Zion. In 1953–1957, the family went back to Iran, returning later to Israel. When his parents divorced and his father remarried, Tahari was sent to a boarding school ("Sde Hemed") in Rishon LeZion, later moving to Tel Aviv ("Maon Hayeled"). The following years were spent in Kvutzat Schiller and an Israeli Air Force boarding school in Haifa.

Elie Tahari emigrated to the United States in 1971 with less than $100. Working as an electrician at a clothing boutique in the Garment District of New York City, he began designing his own clothing line after popularizing the iconic tube top in 1973. His namesake label, Tahari, launched in 1974 with a boutique located on Madison Avenue in New York City.

Career
Inspired by the '70s era's disco culture, Elie Tahari created dance dresses and blouses, debuting his first fashion show in 1977 at the New York City nightclub Studio 54.

In the 1980s, Tahari turned his attention to the tailored suit, with more office-centric designs as women joined the workforce and the ranks of the business elite. He was admitted to the Council of Fashion Designers of America in 1994. In 1997, he teamed with Andrew Rosen to launch the ready-to-wear label Theory.

The 2000s saw an expansion of his brand into men's ready-to-wear, accessories, jewelry, footwear and home goods. In 2012, Elie Tahari was a guest judge on the America television series Project Runway All Stars which aired on Lifetime. He collaborated with Kohl's DesigNation in 2014 and launched ET Sport in 2015.

Awards and honors 
In honor of forty years in the fashion industry, then-Mayor Michael Bloomberg declared "Elie Tahari Day" in New York City on September 4, 2013. The event was marked with the debut of the Elie Tahari Edition 1974 – a one-off capsule that featured reworked pieces from the designer's archive. In 2014, Tahari was honored with the Ellis Island Medal of Honor which pays homage to the immigrant experience and the contribution made to America by immigrants and their children. Tahari received the Brand Vision Award from the Fashion Group International in 2014. In 2021, a feature documentary is done about Elie Tahari's life, directed and produced by David Serero, called "The United States of fashion designer Elie Tahari." The film is selected in more than 100 film festivals and won several awards, including Best Documentary, Best Fashion Documentary, Best Director, Best Producer.

References

External links

 
 History of Tahari Suits
 
 The Marker Week, economy supplement of the newspaper "Haaretz",16.7.2009 – report by Raz Smolski- in Hebrew

1952 births
American fashion designers
American people of Jewish descent
Israeli brands
Israeli fashion designers
Israeli Jews
Israeli emigrants to the United States
Israeli people of Iranian-Jewish descent
Jewish fashion designers
Living people
People from Jerusalem